Surrogate Valentine is a 2011 independent comedy film directed and produced by Dave Boyle. The film's plot concerns a musician named Goh Nakamura, playing a fictionalized version of himself. It is the first in a trilogy following Nakamura's character, followed by Daylight Savings (2012) and I Will Make You Mine (2020).

Premise
San Francisco indie musician Goh Nakamura lives a life playing shows on the road. He reconnects with his high school crush, and is hired to teach an actor, Danny Turner, how to play guitar for a film role.

Cast
 Goh Nakamura as himself
 Chadd Stoops as Danny Turner
 Lynn Chen as Rachel
 Parry Shen as Bradley
 Mary Cavett as Valerie
 Joy Osmanski as Amy
 Calpernia Addams as Tammi
 Eric M. Levy as Arthur
 Dan Damage as Mark
 Di Quon as Emily

Reception
Critical response to the film was generally positive. Rotten Tomatoes reports a 60% approval rating based on 5 reviews.

John DeFore of The Hollywood Reporter called the film "a slight, but amiable buddy comedy" as well as saying that it "offers a certain mild slacker charm". Michelle Orange of The Village Voice also gave a positive review of the film saying that it "cultivates a sweet, shucksy tone that wears thin in some of the early scenes, but ultimately deepens into genuine heart". David DeWitt of The New York Times wrote that the film "sometimes catches an insightful moment in the offstage lives of gigging musicians, and shots of San Francisco have photo-realist charm. But the story never asserts itself in any dramatic or comedic or even home-movie fashion."

References

2011 films
Comedy films about Asian Americans
Films about music and musicians
2010s English-language films
2010s American films
2011 comedy films